Fender skirts, known in Australia and the United Kingdom as spats, are pieces of bodywork on the fender that cover the upper portions of the tires of an automobile. They are usually used on rear wheels only, but some models have them on all four wheels.

Functions

Fender skirts are implemented for both aesthetic and aerodynamic reasons. Rather than air flowing into and being trapped in the rear wheel well, it flows smoothly over the bodywork. They are generally detachable to allow for tire changes and installation of snow chains. Automakers have also experimented with integral front wheel fender skirts, as on the 1949–1954 Nash "Airflyte" models and the compact 1950–1954 Nash Rambler, but with success limited by the fact that the front wheels must pivot for steering, extending out from the side of the vehicle slightly. The 1955 Ford Thunderbird introduced rear "fender shields" as a type of fender skirts with an edge molding and a gravel shield. In GM parts accessories books, fender skirts are known as fender shields.

History

First described as "pants", they were used for the streamlining effect by Frank Lockhart on a 1928 Stutz land speed record attempt car. Factory production of fender skirts began with the 1932 Graham-Paige. Aesthetically streamlined designs were copied to mass-produced models. The innovations introduced by Amos Northup, such as the V'd radiators, fender skirts, and sloping beaver-tails, became common after 1933. The fender skirt the "stylish cars in the past, making them look like glorious floating boats, classy and elegant."

Fender skirts remained a feature for some time longer on a few cars, particularly large American luxury cars. However, by the 1970s, fender skirts began to disappear from mass-market automobiles. 

Fender skirts were often paired with whitewall tires. The extent of the skirt also varied; before the 1950s it was common for all but the very bottom of the rear tire to be covered, while by the 1960s fender skirts only covered some of the top of the tire and were largely absent on cars other than top-line models. For example, starting in the mid-1960s until 1976, the Chevrolet Caprice, Oldsmobile 98, Buick Electra, Pontiac Bonneville, as well as the Cadillac Fleetwood, DeVille, and Calais models used fender skirts. The Cadillac Eldorado models featured fender skirts from 1971 thru 1974. Starting in 1977 only the Pontiac Bonneville retained the use of fender skirts on General Motors' downsized cars. In 1980 the Oldsmobile returned the fender skirts to its 98 model. By 1985, fender skirts disappeared from all standard General Motors cars. In 1989, fender skirts were used again on the Cadillac front-wheel drive Fleetwood models until 1993. For the 1991-1996 model years, General Motors generally incorporated fender skirts into the design of their full-size sedans for the Chevrolet Caprice, Buick Roadmaster, and Cadillac Fleetwood. The General Motors EV1 also had fender skirts.

When making Kustoms, fender skirts are a must accessory to close the rear fenders and add a special kind of sleekness.

In European automobile design, Citroën notably used fender skirts on nearly all models produced between 1950 and 1990, most prominently in the DS, 2CV, Ami, GS, SM, BX, and CX.

To enhance fuel economy, the General Motors EV1 electric car included fender skirts. Mass production models with fender skirts included the 1999-2006 Honda Insight and the Clarity in 2016. In 2013, the limited production Volkswagen XL1 also used fender skirts.

Although they are available for some new cars as aftermarket accessories (the Chrysler PT Cruiser and Volkswagen Beetle being some examples). The fender skirt accessory may arguably not contribute the aesthetics of modern cars, but look "either tacky, strange, outlandish, or just plain ugly."

Some cities, such as Los Angeles, have fender skirts on municipal buses for safety purposes, as they can prevent items on the road from slipping under the tires.

References

Automotive body parts